Top Country Albums is a chart that ranks the top-performing country music albums in the United States, published by Billboard.  In 1997, eight different albums topped the chart, based on electronic point of sale data provided by SoundScan Inc.

The number-one position was occupied for more than half of the year by LeAnn Rimes, who had first topped the chart the previous year when she was 13 years old.  In the issue of Billboard dated January 4, Rimes held the top spot with her album Blue, the record's 20th week in the top spot.  Blue occupied the peak position for the first eight weeks of 1997, after which it was displaced by Unchained Melody: The Early Years, also by Rimes.  This was a compilation of tracks released to capitalize on the success of her first major-label album, and consisted mostly of tracks from the independent album All That, originally released when she was aged 11.  It spent 10 consecutive weeks at number one, meaning that Rimes occupied the top spot from the start of the year until early May.  In September, Blue spent one final week at number one and then Rimes returned to the top spot with her next album You Light Up My Life: Inspirational Songs, which spent eight weeks atop the chart, giving the teenage singer a total of 27 weeks at number one in 1997.

In November, Canadian singer Shania Twain entered the chart at number one with the album Come On Over.  The album initially only spent three weeks at number one, but would return to the top spot repeatedly, eventually spending a total of 50 weeks at number one, making it the longest-running chart-topper in the history of the Top Country Albums listing.  In 2000, it was recognized by the Recording Industry Association of America as the highest-selling album of all time by a female artist, as well as the biggest-selling country album.  The year's final number one was Sevens by Garth Brooks, which also topped the all-genre Billboard 200 chart.  It was the singer's fifth consecutive number one and his ninth consecutive multi-platinum album.  Three months earlier, Trisha Yearwood, who would marry Brooks in 2005, gained her first number one with (Songbook) A Collection of Hits.

Chart history

References

1997
1997 record charts